Harpalus balli is a species of ground beetle in the subfamily Harpalinae. It was described by Noonan in 1991.

References

balli
Beetles described in 1991